Slide is the fifth album by Lisa Germano. It was released in 1998 by 4AD, and was her last album for the label.

Critical reception
CMJ New Music Monthly called the album Germano's best to date, writing that she "is becoming more melodically grounded, and has acquired a knack for providing a visceral punch when things become too ethereal."

Track listing
 "Way Below the Radio"
 "No Color Here"
 "Tomorrowing"
 "Electrified"
 "Slide"
 "If I Think of Love"
 "Crash"
 "Wood Floors"
 "Turning into Betty"
 "Guillotine"
 "Reptile"

All songs written by Lisa Germano.

The song "If I Think of Love" was previously performed by Germano on the OP8 album Slush.

The song "Wood Floors" was covered by William Hut on his album Road Star Doolittle.

Personnel
Tchad Blake, Mitchell Froom, Joe Gore, Jerry Marotta, Craig Ross, Jerry Scheff, Pete Thomas.  (Individual credits were not listed.)

Credits
 Produced by Tchad Blake.
 Engineered by Tchad Blake and S. Husky Höskulds at The Sound Factory in Hollywood, and by Germano at her home.
 Mixed by Tchad Blake at The Sound Factory.
 Mastered by Bob Ludwig at Gateway.
 Art direction by Paul McMenamin.
 Photography by Matthew Welch.
 Illustration by Paige Imatani.

References

Lisa Germano albums
1998 albums
Albums produced by Tchad Blake
4AD albums